= FLPD =

FLPD may refer to:

- Fort Lauderdale Police Department
- Fort Lee Police Department
